Skrzynka may refer to:

Skrzynka, Lower Silesian Voivodeship (south-west Poland)
Skrzynka, Dąbrowa County in Lesser Poland Voivodeship (south Poland)
Skrzynka, Myślenice County in Lesser Poland Voivodeship (south Poland)
Skrzynka, West Pomeranian Voivodeship (north-west Poland)